Clermont is a town in Hall County, Georgia, United States. The population was 875 at the 2010 census. It is part of the Gainesville, GA Metropolitan Statistical Area.

History
An early variant name was "Dip". A post office called Dip was established in 1892, and the name was changed to Clermont in 1905. The Georgia General Assembly incorporated the place in 1913 as the "Town of Clermont", with municipal corporate limits extending in a one-mile radius from the intersection of King and Main streets.

Geography

Clermont is located in northern Hall County at  (34.477171, -83.774044). U.S. Route 129 passes through the town, leading north  to Cleveland and south  to Gainesville, the county seat.  Georgia State Route 283 and Georgia State Route 284 intersect in Clermont.

Demographics

As of the census of 2000, there were 419 people, 161 households, and 124 families residing in the town. The racial makeup of the town was 96.18% White, 0.95% African American, 1.43% Native American, 0.24% Asian, and 1.19% from two or more races. Hispanic or Latino of any race were 0.48% of the population.

There were 161 households, out of which 34.8% had children under the age of 18 living with them, 63.4% were married couples living together, 11.2% had a female householder with no husband present, and 22.4% were non-families. 18.0% of all households were made up of individuals, and 6.2% had someone living alone who was 65 years of age or older.  The average household size was 2.60 and the average family size was 2.94.

In the town, the population was spread out, with 25.5% under the age of 18, 8.8% from 18 to 24, 31.0% from 25 to 44, 22.7% from 45 to 64, and 11.9% who were 65 years of age or older.  The median age was 35 years. For every 100 females, there were 93.1 males.  For every 100 females age 18 and over, there were 97.5 males.

The median income for a household in the town was $43,333, and the median income for a family was $46,000. Males had a median income of $31,875 versus $25,000 for females. The per capita income for the town was $15,558.  About 4.8% of families and 5.6% of the population were below the poverty line, including 2.5% of those under age 18 and 1.9% of those age 65 or over.

References

External links

Town of Clermont official website

Towns in Hall County, Georgia
Towns in Georgia (U.S. state)